Live is the 1992 EP by heavy metal band Reverend. This is Reverend's only live offering to date. It is also the last release before the band temporarily broke up, although they reformed in 2000. Most of the songs on this EP come from Reverend's full-length releases, with one ("The Power of Persuasion") coming from Reverend's EP debut.

Track listing

Lineup
David Wayne: Vocals
Brian Korban: Guitars
Ernesto Martinez: Guitars
Angelo Espino: Bass
Jason Ian: Drums

1992 live albums
Reverend (band) albums
1992 EPs
Charisma Records live albums
Charisma Records EPs
Live EPs